The following is an incomplete list of festivals in Florida.

Festivals in Florida

Arts, cultural, and other

Music festivals

 9 Mile Music Festival
 AURA Music and Arts Festival
 Cornerstone Florida
 Electric Daisy Carnival
 The Fest
 Florida Folk Festival
 Florida Music Festival
 Global Gathering 2006
 Harvest of Hope Fest
 Hotel Carolina
 Jacksonville Jazz Festival
 La Musica
 Lakeside Jazz Festival
 Langerado
 Miami Nice Jazz Festival
 Miami Pop Festival (December 1968)
 Miami Pop Festival (May 1968)
 Planetfest
 Rock the Universe
 Springing the Blues
 Suwannee Hulaween
 Ultra Music Festival
 Wanee Music Festival
 Winter Music Conference

Film festivals

 American Black Film Festival
 Borscht Film Festival
 Florida Film Festival
 Gasparilla Film Festival
 India International Film Festival of Tampa Bay
 Israel Film Festival
 Jacksonville Film Festival
 Love Your Shorts Film Festival
 Miami International Film Festival
 Miami Short Film Festival
 Orlando Film Festival
 Palm Beach International Film Festival
 Sarasota Film Festival
 Sicilian Film Festival
 Tampa Bay Jewish Film Festival
 Tampa International Gay and Lesbian Film Festival

Food festivals

 Epcot International Food and Wine Festival
 Florida Strawberry Festival
 Food Network South Beach Wine and Food Festival
 King Mango Strut
 Kumquat Festival
 Land o' Lakes Flapjack Festival
 Tallahassee Food Festival
 Tallahassee Wine and Food Festival
International Cuban Sandwich Festival  
Taste of Latino

See also
List of festivals in the United States

References

External links

florida
 
Festivals
Florida
Food festivals in Florida